The News-Item is the main newspaper serving the City of Shamokin, Pennsylvania, and the surrounding areas. It is based in Shamokin. On October 1, 2015, Sample News Group acquired The News-Item and other properties from Times-Shamrock Communications.

References

External links
Official website

Newspapers published in Pennsylvania